The Arop House is a building in Von Brandis & Kerk Street, Johannesburg, South Africa. Construction commenced in 1931 and completed in 1932 by Hermann Kallenbach, a close friend of Mahatma Gandhi, along with his partners Kennedy and Furner. The building is characterized by balconies with steel balusterades and its name was inspired by a Soviet petroleum company with the same name , the building is in a dilapidated state.

References

Bank buildings in South Africa
Buildings and structures in Johannesburg
Heritage Buildings in Johannesburg
Buildings and structures completed in 1932
20th-century architecture in South Africa